Somewhere My Love and Other Great Hits is an album by Ray Conniff and The Singers. It was released in 1966 on the Columbia label (catalog no. CS-9319). The title track reached No. 9 on the singles chart.

The album debuted on Billboard magazine's "Top LPs" chart on July 30, 1966, peaked at No. 3, and remained on that chart for 41 weeks. It was certified by the RIAA as a platinum record.

AllMusic later gave the album a rating of three stars. Reviewer Cub Koda called it the "lushest of all Conniff albums."

Track listing
Side 1
 "Red Roses for a Blue Lady" (Sid Tepper, Roy C. Bennett)
 "Downtown" (Tony Hatch)
 "Charade" (from the motion picture Charade) (Henry Mancini, Johnny Mercer)
 "King of the Road" (Roger Miller)
 "Edelweiss" (from The Sound of Music) (Rodgers and Hammerstein)
 "Young and Foolish" (from Plain and Fancy) (Albert Hague, Arnold B. Horwitt)

Side 2
 "Somewhere, My Love" ("Lara's Theme" from Dr. Zhivago) (Maurice Jarre, Paul Francis Webster)
 "Days of Wine and Roses" (from the motion picture Days of Wine and Roses) (Henry Mancini, Johnny Mercer)
 "Tie Me Kangaroo Down, Sport" (vocal solo by Jay Meyer) (written by Rolf Harris)
 "Wouldn't It Be Loverly" (from the musical production My Fair Lady) (Alan Jay Lerner, Frederick Loewe)
 "So Long, Farewell" (from the musical production The Sound of Music) (Rodgers and Hammerstein)

References

1966 albums
Columbia Records albums
Ray Conniff albums